Posht Darb-e Sofla (also Romanized as Posht Darb-e Soflá; also known as Boneh-ye ‘Abd and Boneh-ye ‘Abd or Rahman) is a village in Aghili-ye Shomali Rural District, Aghili District, Gotvand County, Khuzestan Province, Iran. At the 2006 census, its population was 294, in 46 families.

References 

Populated places in Gotvand County